Max Weinhold (born 30 April 1982 in Munich) is a field hockey player from Germany who plays in goal. He was a member of the Men's National Team that won the gold medal at the 2008 Summer Olympics. He was also chosen to represent his country at the 2012 London Summer Olympics where Germany again won gold.

References

External links
 

The Official Website of the Beijing 2008 Olympic Games

1982 births
Living people
German male field hockey players
Olympic field hockey players of Germany
Field hockey players at the 2008 Summer Olympics
Olympic gold medalists for Germany
Olympic medalists in field hockey
Field hockey players at the 2012 Summer Olympics
Medalists at the 2012 Summer Olympics
Medalists at the 2008 Summer Olympics
2010 Men's Hockey World Cup players
21st-century German people